NATO-Ukraine Civic League is a Ukrainian non-governmental organization, partnership network of NGOs (associations of citizens) which support Euro-Atlantic/European course of Ukraine.

History 
That day 26 NGOs joined the League.

Ukrainian Integration into NATO: working together, the First All-Ukraine NGO's Assembly of NATO-Ukraine Civic League in Kyiv, Ukraine took place on October 20, 2003. George Robertson, Secretary General of NATO taken part in Assembly.

Since April 27, 2006, the Head of the Coordination Council of the NATO-Ukraine League is Serhiy Dzherdzh, Ph.D. League unites 48 NGOs today (2015).

Statutory mission 

The Partnership Network activities should make a substantial impact on development of positive attitude of people to the strategic direction of defense and security policy implementation in Ukraine.

It is also expected to:
 Increase public engagement and involvement of NGOs into discussing key issues of Ukraine’s defense and security;
 Promote active participation of public authorities in activities aimed at informing public on the current status of NATO transformation and Ukraine’s Euro-Atlantic course;
 Raise awareness of the society concerning the collective security system, NATO in particular, and cooperation between Ukraine and the Alliance;
 Increase the number of supporters of the future Ukrainian membership in the Alliance, first of all among representatives of security sector, decommissioned military personnel, defense industry and military servicemen family members;
 Strengthen support of Euro-Atlantic aspirations of Ukraine by political parties, movements and various mass media.

See also
 Ukraine–NATO relations

References

External links
 NATO-Ukraine Civic League Website 

Organizations established in 2003
Political organizations based in Ukraine
2003 establishments in Ukraine
Ukraine–NATO relations